The 1962 United States Senate election in Iowa took place on November 6, 1962. Incumbent Republican Senator Bourke B. Hickenlooper was re-elected to a fourth term in office over Democrat E.B. Smith.

Republican primary

Candidates
Herbert F. Hoover
Bourke B. Hickenlooper, incumbent Senator since 1945

Results

Democratic primary

Candidates
E.B. Smith, Iowa State University history professor

Results

General election

Results

See also 
 1962 United States Senate elections

References 

1962
Iowa
United States Senate